Malikkand may refer to:
Məlikkənd, Azerbaijan
Malekan, Iran

See also
 Melikkend (disambiguation)